James Hunter Lane (July 20, 1900 – September 12, 1994) was a third baseman in Major League Baseball. He played for the Boston Braves in 1924.  He also played college football as an end for the Tennessee Volunteers football team. He was known by the nickname "Dodo" Lane while playing for Tennessee.

References

External links

1900 births
1994 deaths
Major League Baseball third basemen
Boston Braves players
Tennessee Volunteers football players
People from Pulaski, Tennessee
Baseball players from Tennessee